Herman Verbauwen (born 16 May 1944) is a Belgian former freestyle and backstroke swimmer. He competed at the 1960, 1964 and the 1968 Summer Olympics.

References

External links
 

1944 births
Living people
Belgian male backstroke swimmers
Belgian male freestyle swimmers
Olympic swimmers of Belgium
Swimmers at the 1960 Summer Olympics
Swimmers at the 1964 Summer Olympics
Swimmers at the 1968 Summer Olympics
Sportspeople from Ghent